Acton Scott is a civil parish in Shropshire, England.  It contains 17 listed buildings that are recorded in the National Heritage List for England.  Of these, two are listed at Grade II*, the middle grade of the three grades, and the others are at Grade II, the lowest grade.  The parish contains the villages of Acton Scott, Marshbrook, and  Alcaston, and is otherwise rural.  The listed buildings include a church and items in the churchyard, a country house and associated structures, other houses, a farm, part of which has been converted into a museum, a bridge, two milestones, and a telephone kiosk.


Key

Buildings

References

Citations

Sources

Lists of buildings and structures in Shropshire